BC Palanga was a professional basketball club based in Palanga, Lithuania that played in the National Basketball League. The team was founded in 2014 after a confusing situation when the BC Palanga team founded in 1999 moved to Vilnius.

Last year's roster

Club history
 The team was founded in 2014, in a confusing situation when two teams wanted to play in Palanga, that being against the LKF rules as Palanga is a city too small to host two teams, the original BC Palanga moved to Vilnius and the newly founded team stayed in Palanga.

References

External links
 Official website of BC Palanga
 BC Palanga NKLyga.lt

 
Basketball teams in Lithuania
Sport in Palanga
Basketball teams established in 2014
2014 establishments in Lithuania